La Paloma is an oil on canvas painting by Catalan painter Isidre Nonell, created in 1904, which is exhibited at the National Art Museum of Catalonia in Barcelona.

Description 
La Paloma, draped in burnt orange against a dark green background, faces away from the viewer as if in deep thought. In this painting, Nonell sharply accentuates her features and uses bold strokes to further define her.

Composition 
The portrait is placed off center and nearly fills the frame. The woman, mostly in shadow faces the muted light.

References 

Paintings in the collection of the Museu Nacional d'Art de Catalunya
1904 paintings